"Get It Together" is a song by American R&B group 702 recorded for the group's debut album No Doubt (1996). The song was released as the second single for the album on January 28, 1997.

The song peaked at number ten on the Billboard Hot 100 chart. By April 1997, it was certified gold in sales by the RIAA, after sales exceeding 800,000 copies in the United States. 

In 2019, the song's chorus was sampled for the intro of Mustard's song, Ballin'.

Release and reception
The song peaked at ten on the U.S. Billboard Hot 100 and reached the third spot on the Hot R&B/Hip-Hop singles chart. The single was certified gold in April 1997. It sold 800,000 copies.

Track listing
7", 12", 33 1/3 RPM, Vinyl
"Get It Together" (LP Version) - 4:50
"Get It Together" (Radio Edit) - 4:01
"Get It Together" (Instrumental) - 4:56
"Get It Together" (A Capella) - 4:21

Charts

Weekly charts

Year-end charts

Personnel
Credits adapted from album booklet liner notes.
production – Donell Jones
vocals (background) – Mary Brown
writing – Donell Jones

Notes

External links

1997 singles
702 (group) songs
Songs written by Donell Jones
1997 songs
Motown singles
Contemporary R&B ballads
Pop ballads
1990s ballads